Carleton Garretson Young (May 26, 1907 – July 11, 1971) was an American actor in radio, film and television.

Early years 
Young was born in Westfield, New York in May 1907. He attended Carnegie Institute of Technology, where he became "one of the most promising of its group of youthful Thespians."

Radio 
From January 10, 1942, until August 1943, he had the title role on The Adventures of Ellery Queen, and from 1943 to 1952, he played Edmond Dantès in Mutual's version of The Count of Monte Cristo. In 1951, he played the leading character on the NBC Radio program, The Whisperer.  Also guest-starred on numerous episodes of The Railroad Hour throughout its 1948-1954 run. Young's other radio roles include those shown in the table below.

Film 
Young appeared in a number of Hollywood films, including The Kissing Bandit (1948), starring Frank Sinatra, and three 1951 movies, His Kind of Woman (with Robert Mitchum), Hard, Fast and Beautiful (with Claire Trevor) and The Blue Veil (with Jane Wyman).

Television 
He worked frequently in TV. In 1959, in the season-two episode of ABC's Leave It to Beaver, Young played John Gates, the father of series character Gilbert Gates (Stephen Talbot). That same year, he was cast, along with Mary Castle, in the episodes "The Big Gamblers" and "The Confidence Gang" of Rex Allen's syndicated western series, Frontier Doctor.

Other television roles were on The Loretta Young Show, Annie Oakley, Sheriff of Cochise, How to Marry a Millionaire, Perry Mason, M Squad, The Rebel, and Bourbon Street Beat. In 1960, he portrayed the character George McKean in "A Murderer's Return" of the ABC western series, The Life and Legend of Wyatt Earp, starring Hugh O'Brian.

Young's last television roles were in 1961 on the ABC/Warner Brothers drama series, The Roaring 20s and on NBC's Tales of Wells Fargo. That same year, his son, Tony Young, starred in the short-lived CBS western, Gunslinger.

Carleton G. Young is sometimes confused with the film actor Carleton Scott Young.

Recognition 
Young has a star at 6733 Hollywood Boulevard in the Radio section of the Hollywood Walk of Fame. It was dedicated February 8, 1960.

Personal life and death 
Young was married to Barbara Davis, and they had a son, actor Tony Young. He died on July 11, 1971, at St. John's Hospital in Santa Monica, California. He was interred at Inglewood Park Cemetery, in Inglewood, California.

Filmography

References

External links 

1907 births
1971 deaths
American male radio actors
American male television actors
Male actors from New York City
People from Greater Los Angeles
Deaths from cancer in California
Burials at Inglewood Park Cemetery
20th-century American male actors